Elizabeth Tkachenko (born February 21, 2006) is an Israeli–American ice dancer who currently represents Israel. With her skating partner, Alexei Kiliakov, she competed in the final segment at the 2022 World Junior Figure Skating Championships.

Personal life 
Tkachenko was born on February 21, 2006, in Rockville, Maryland to parents Valery and Oxana. She has a brother, Alexander. Tkachenko and her skating partner, Alexei Kiliakov, have known each other since they were toddlers.

Career

Early years 
Tkachenko began learning how to skate at age three in public sessions. She was later invited to join the Wheaton Ice Skating Academy (WISA), founded by her current coaches, former Russian ice dancers Alexei Kiliakov and Elena Novak, and her brother. Tkachenko teamed up with her current skating partner, Alexei Kiliakov Jr., in 2011.

Programs

With Kiliakov

Competitive highlights 
CS: Challenger Series; JGP: Junior Grand Prix

With Kiliakov for Israel

With Kiliakov for the United States

References

External links 
 

2006 births
Living people
American female ice dancers
Israeli female ice dancers
People from Rockville, Maryland